"You Are" is a song co-written and recorded by American country music artist Jimmy Wayne.  It was released in 2004 as the third single from the album Jimmy Wayne.  The song reached #18 on the Billboard Hot Country Singles & Tracks chart.  The song was written by Wayne, Marv Green, Aimee Mayo and Chris Lindsey.

Chart performance

References

2004 singles
Jimmy Wayne songs
Songs written by Aimee Mayo
Songs written by Marv Green
Songs written by Chris Lindsey
Song recordings produced by James Stroud
Song recordings produced by Chris Lindsey
2003 songs
DreamWorks Records singles
Songs written by Jimmy Wayne